Tears on Tape is the eighth and final studio album by Finnish rock band HIM, released 26 April 2013 in Finland, 29 April 2013 in Europe, and on 30 April 2013 in the US and Canada.

Background 
At the beginning of 2011 HIM parted ways with Sire Records. In May the band began rehearsing songs for the full-length follow-up to 2010's Screamworks: Love in Theory and Practice. After a few months of rehearsals, the band's drummer, Mika Karppinen, began complaining of pain in his wrists. Medical examinations concluded that he had nerve damage in his hands and arms caused by repetitive stress. Karppinen was told by his doctors to stop drumming so that he would have time to heal. During this time the band's singer, Ville Valo, was said to have filled in on drums while working on new material. Subsequent treatments were successful and after about eight months the band was able to start rehearsing with Karppinen again.

Rehearsals began in northern summer of 2012 and in September the band entered Finnvox Studios in Helsinki, Finland to begin tracking for the new album with producer Hiili Hiilesmaa. This would be their fourth album recorded at the famed studio as well as their fourth with Hiilesmaa at the helm. During this time, live in-studio performances were recorded in both audio and video to be used as bonus tracks. This was the same session that produced the music video for their cover of the Ké song "Strange World", released on the compilation XX – Two Decades of Love Metal. In November 2012 Tim Palmer began mixing tracks in London and completed in early December.

Because the band had lacked a label the new album was paid for out of pocket, putting them in a unique position of owning all publishing rights to their music which allowed them to shop the album to various labels for distribution. In February 2013 it was announced that the new album would be licensed to three separate record companies, one for each market. Agreements were reached with Universal Records in Europe, Razor & Tie in the United States, and Cooking Vinyl's new rock imprint DoubleCross in the United Kingdom and Ireland. With this new strategy came the decision to release separate singles simultaneously to each market. The track "Into the Night" was chosen for the Finnish market, "All Lips Go Blue" for the UK and US, and "Tears on Tape" for the rest of Europe. Music videos were filmed for each single in late February to early March 2013.

Tears on Tape is the first and only HIM release to include instrumental interludes.

Artwork and packaging 
The album's artwork, created by Daniel P. Carter, consists of a snake, circling the heartagram which is encased in a heptagram, or more specifically the Seal of Babalon. There are markings on the snake's back, a code in Malachim which when decoded says, "Tears on tape, I will follow into your heart sketching rain from afar. Tears on tape, she surrenders needle in arm while we dance into the storm," the chorus lyrics from the album's title track.

The album has been offered in several special editions and bundles. On 15 February Metal Hammer Magazine announced that they would be offering a preorder fanpack that includes the full UK release album, two bonus tracks, a double-sided door poster, and a 132-page magazine edited by Ville Valo. The demand for this preorder was so high that the ordering website's server was overloaded and briefly orders could only be made by telephone. In the United States, MerchNow has offered several preorder bundles including various pieces of apparel, posters, CD/DVD combo, digital downloads, and four limited edition vinyl versions of the album in transparent green, transparent blue, clear, and cream.

Track listing

Personnel 
 Ville Valo – lead vocals, acoustic guitar, drums and bass guitar on "Kiss the Void", piano on "Trapped in Autumn"
 Mikko Viljami "Linde" Lindström – lead guitar
 Mikko Henrik Julius "Migé" Paananen – bass guitar
 Janne Johannes "Emerson Burton" Puurtinen – keyboards, backing vocals
 Mika Kristian "Gas Lipstick" Karppinen – drums
Produced and engineered by Hiili Hiilesmaa; recorded at Finnvox Studios, Helsinki
Record engineering assisted by Jesse Valo and Sebastian Bisso
Mixed by Tim Palmer at Assault & Battery Studios, London
Mix assisted by John Catlin; additional mixing/recording at '62 Studios, Room 332 & T.O.S.
Mastered by Ted Jensen at Sterling Sound, New York City
Art by Daniel P. Carter
Layout by Rami Mursula
Management by Hinterland
Music and lyrics by Ville Valo
Published by Heartagram
Licensed by Himsalabim Oy

Charts 

On 8 May 2013, Razor & Tie announced that Tears on Tape had sold 20,200 copies in its first week in the United States alone, making it HIM's second-highest-charting album in the United States behind Venus Doom.

References

External links 
Facebook.com

HIM (Finnish band) albums
2013 albums